Gary Lamont is a Scottish actor, best known for his role as hairdresser Robbie Fraser in the soap opera River City, a role which he played from 2009 to 2017.

Career
Lamont grew up in the Castlemilk area of Glasgow. He attended the RSAMD in Glasgow. As well as his popular role on River City, he appeared in the French war drama Joyeux Noel, Edinburgh crime drama Rebus and comedy Still Game as a barrister. 

After leaving River City, he trained to be a funeral celebrant as a sideline and made it the subject of his 2019 Edinburgh Fringe show. Lamont appeared in the 2022 Netlix film Boiling Point alongside Stephen Graham

Television
 Rebus (2006)
 Still Game (2007)
 River City (2009- 2017)
 The North Water (2021) as Webster 
  Boiling Point (2022)

Filmography
Joyeux Noel (2005) as a Scottish soldier

References

Male actors from Glasgow
Scottish male film actors
Scottish male stage actors
Scottish male television actors
Living people
Scottish male soap opera actors
Alumni of the Royal Conservatoire of Scotland
21st-century Scottish male actors
Year of birth missing (living people)